Sonny Truitt was an American jazz trombonist, pianist, and composer. He was best known for his work with Miles Davis.

Discography

With Bill Chapin
Jim Chapin Sextet (Prestige, 1955)
With Miles Davis
Miles Davis and Horns (Prestige, 1953)
With Charlie Mariano
Charlie Mariano (Prestige, 1951)
With Tony Scott
The Complete Tony Scott (RCA, 1956)
With The Six (John Glasel & Bob Wilber)
 The View from Jazzbo's Head (Bethlehem, 1956)

References

American jazz trombonists
Male trombonists
American jazz pianists
American male pianists
American male jazz musicians